Borj-e Balan (also Romanized as Borj-e Bālān; also known as Bālān and Bārān) is a village in Zalian Rural District, Zalian District, Shazand County, Markazi Province, Iran. At the 2006 census, its population was 104, in 25 families.

References 

Populated places in Shazand County